Trujillo District is one of eleven districts of the province Trujillo in Peru.  This district is the heart of the city of Trujillo, because it is the commercial and financial center of the city. The most important malls, banks and other business of the city are located in this district.

Neighborhoods
This is a list of the urban areas and neighborhoods that belong to this district.

Centro Histórico
San Andrés
La Merced
El Recreo
Monserrate
La Perla
Mansiche
San Salvador
El Alambre
Las Capullanas
Trupal
San Nicolás
Covicorti
Santa Inés
San Fernando
San Isidro
Primavera
Las Quintanas
Huerta Grande
Miraflores
Los Jardines
Los Cedros
Mochica
El Molino
La Intendencia
Aranjuez
Palermo
Santa María
Chicago
El Sol
Las Casuarinas
Los Pinos
Vista Hermosa
La Arboleda
San Eloy
Ingeniería
Pay Pay
Santa Teresa de Avila
Daniel Hoyle
Los Granados
Chimú
La Rinconada
Rázuri
Vista Bella
Santo Dominguito
Los Rosales de San Andrés
La Noria
El Bosque

See also 
List of districts of La Libertad Region
Trujillo Province

References